"This Could Be Anywhere in the World" is a song recorded by Alexisonfire for their third album Crisis (2006). It was released as the album's first single in mid-2006 and the music video topped MuchMusic's Countdown for the week of October 13, 2006. The song was nominated at the 2007 MuchMusic Video Awards for MuchLOUD Best Rock Video, People's Choice: Favourite Canadian Group and won the award for Best Cinematography. The song was featured on the video game MLB 07: The Show.

2006 singles
Alexisonfire songs
2006 songs
Vagrant Records singles